Rineloricaria cacerensis is a species of catfish in the family Loricariidae. It is native to South America, where it occurs in the Paraguay River basin in Brazil, with its type locality reportedly being Cáceres in the state of Mato Grosso. The species is believed to be a facultative air-breather, like other members of the genus Rineloricaria.

References 

Loricariidae
Fish described in 1912
Catfish of South America
Fish of Brazil